"Stay with My Bright Eyes" is a song by Australian band Something with Numbers; it was the first single from their third studio album Engineering the Soul.

The single was listed at number 48 on the Triple J Hottest 100, 2008 and had a music video created which received airplay on Video Hits and Channel V.

Track listing
"Stay with Me Bright Eyes"
"Night Before"
"Zombie" (acoustic)

Charts

Reference

2008 singles
2008 songs
Something with Numbers songs